The Saga Prize was a literary award for new Black British novelists, which ran from 1995 to 1998.

History
The actress and writer Marsha Hunt established the Saga Prize in 1995 to recognise the literature emerging from indigenous black Britons' experiences. The prize – of £3,000 and a book contract – was for unpublished first novels. To be eligible, entrants needed a black African ancestor and to have been born in the United Kingdom or Republic of Ireland. The prize was sponsored by the travel firm Saga plc. Judges included Andrea Levy and Margaret Busby.

The "afrocentric" nature of the Saga Prize and its restrictive definition of blackness caused controversy. The Commission for Racial Equality objected to its creation, and the Society of Authors refused to support it. The prize was successful, nevertheless, and ran for four years until 1998, winners including Diran Adebayo and Joanna Traynor.

Winners
 1995: Diran Adebayo, Some Kind of Black
 1996: Joanna Traynor, Sister Josephine
 1997: Judith Bryan, Bernard and the Cloth Monkey
 1998: Ike Eze-Anyika, Canteen Culture

References

British fiction awards
Literary awards honoring minority groups
20th-century literary awards
1995 establishments in the United Kingdom
Awards established in 1995
Awards disestablished in 1998
1998 disestablishments in the United Kingdom
Black British literature